Francis Factor (August 18, 1904 – June 7, 1996), also known as Max Factor Jr., was an American businessman who was president of the Max Factor Cosmetics empire.

Early life
He was born Francis Factor in St. Louis, Missouri, the son of Max Factor, a Polish-Jewish businessman and cosmetics pioneer. Known as "Frank," his family moved to Los Angeles, California, in 1908 where he began working in the family business while still a boy.

Career
Because Max Factor was recovering from being hit by a delivery van at the time, Frank Factor took the lead over the two years that it took to develop a suitable make-up for use with the newly developed Technicolor film. This make-up was released to the film industry under the name "Pan-Cake". It was immediately a hit and its advantages led to women stealing it from the film sets and using it privately. Its only disadvantage for every day use was that it could not be used at night as it made the skin too dark under all except under the powerful lights used in film studios. While his father wanted to reserve the product for film use, Frank Factor was open to the commercial possibilities and began developing lighter shades.  At the time the company was only able to produce enough to meet studio demand which until production could be increased delayed commercial release until 1937. Backed by a colour based national advertising campaign, it immediately became the fastest and largest selling single make-up item to date, as well as the standard make-up used in all Technicolor films.

After his father's death in 1938, Frank Factor legally changed his name to Max Factor Jr. and as president expanded the still private cosmetics firm, along with members of the immediate family. He was heavily involved with the development of new products, particularly "Tru-Color" released in 1940 as the first smear-proof lipstick.

Personal life
Max Factor Jr. was married in 1933 to  Mildred “Milly” Cohen with whom he remained for thirty-seven years until her death in 1970. The couple raced Thoroughbred horses for many years. He had a home in the Deep Well neighborhood of Palm Springs, California. Factor died in 1996 and was interred in the Hillside Memorial Park Cemetery in Culver City, California.

References

External links

 

American cosmetics businesspeople
American chief executives of fashion industry companies
1904 births
1996 deaths
American businesspeople in retailing
American retail chief executives
American people of Polish-Jewish descent
American racehorse owners and breeders
California people in fashion
Businesspeople from Los Angeles
Businesspeople from St. Louis
Businesspeople from Palm Springs, California
Burials at Hillside Memorial Park Cemetery
20th-century American businesspeople